Tasca is a surname. Notable people with the surname include:

Angelo Tasca (1892–1960), Italian politician and historical writer
Fausto Bellino Tasca (1885–1937), Italian-American artist
Henry J. Tasca (1912–1979), American diplomat 
Marco Tasca (born 1957), Italian Roman Catholic priest and educator
Pierantonio Tasca (1858–1934), Italian opera composer

Italian-language surnames